George Anthony Armstrong Willis (1897–1976), known as Anthony Armstrong, was an Anglo-Canadian writer, dramatist and essayist. A humorist who contributed to Punch and The New Yorker magazines, he wrote well-plotted crime plays including Ten Minute Alibi (1933).

Biography

Anthony Armstrong was the son of George Hughlings Armstrong Willis and Adela Emma Temple Frere. Although his parents were both English, he was born in Esquimalt, British Columbia as a consequence of his father's career as a Paymaster Captain in the Royal Navy. They returned to England before his brother's birth in 1900 in Dorset. He was educated at Uppingham School. His brother John Christopher Temple Willis (1900–1969) was Director-General of the Ordnance Survey 1953–1957, and a watercolourist.
During the First World War Willis was commissioned as a 2nd Lieutenant in the Royal Engineers in 1915. He was awarded the Military Cross in 1916.

He married Frances Monica Sealy, and had three children: John Humfrey Armstrong Willis (1928–2012), Antonia Armstrong Willis (1932-2017), and Felicity Armstrong Willis (1936-2006). Antonia married the art expert and gallery owner Jeremy Maas; one of their sons, Rupert, is also an art expert, notable for his appearances on the Antiques Roadshow. Jonathan, another of their sons, is the current intellectual property rights holder for Anthony Armstrong's works and can be reached via his London agents, Eric Glass Ltd.

Armstrong contributed to the screenplay of Alfred Hitchcock's Young and Innocent (1937). Several of his own works were adapted into films including The Strange Case of Mr Pelham, which was made into a first-season episode of Alfred Hitchcock Presents (and directed by Hitchcock), and the film The Man Who Haunted Himself (1970).

Major works

Novels

 Lure of the Past (1920)
 The Love of Prince Raameses (1921)
 The Wine of Death: A Tale of the Lost Long-Ago (1925)
 Patrick, Undergraduate (1926)
 The Trail of Fear (1927)
 The Secret Trail (1928)
 The Trail of the Lotto (1929)
 Apple and Percival (1931)
 The Trail of the Black King (1931)
 The Poison Trail (1932)
 Britisher on Broadway (1932)
 Easy Warriors (1932)
 Ten Minute Alibi (1934) – novelization of his play, adapted as a 1935 film
  Without Witness (1934)
 Cottage into House (1936)
 The End of the Road (1943)
 When the Bells Rang: A Tale of What Might Have Been  (1943)
 No Higher Mountain (1951)
 He Was Found in the Road (1952) – adapted as the 1956 film The Man in the Road
 Spies in Amber (1956)
 The Strange Case of Mr. Pelham (1957) – adapted as the 1970 film The Man Who Haunted Himself - this novel (The Strange Case of Mr. Pelham) has been republished in 2021 and is available to pre-order on Amazon and available to buy direct from 6 December 2021.  Audio and eBook versions are also in production.
 One Jump Ahead (1973)

Short story collections 

 The Prince Who Hiccupped and Other Tales: Being Some Fairy Tales for Grownups (1932)
 The Pack of Pieces (1942) – more fairy tales for adults

Plays

 In the Dentist's Chair (1931)
 Orders Are Orders (1932)
 The Eleventh Hour (1933)
 Ten Minute Alibi (1933)
 Mile-Away Murder (1937)

References

External links 

 
 

1897 births
1976 deaths
Canadian male novelists
20th-century Canadian dramatists and playwrights
20th-century English novelists
English dramatists and playwrights
People from Esquimalt, British Columbia
People educated at Uppingham School
20th-century Canadian novelists
Canadian male dramatists and playwrights
English male novelists
20th-century Canadian male writers
Recipients of the Military Cross
Royal Engineers officers
British Army personnel of World War I
20th-century English male writers